The Hill O Many Stanes is a south-facing hillside (at ) in Mid Clyth, about  south of Wick in Caithness, in the Highland area of Scotland, which has about 200 upright stones, none more than a metre high, set out in rows running approximately north and south with the incline. The rows are not parallel, however, and they create a fan-shaped pattern. This arrangement is believed to be a relic of Bronze Age times.

If the night sky is clear the moon in its most southerly rising position will be seen over those same hills. In Megalithic Lunar Observatories (Oxford University Press, 1971) Alexander Thom presented evidence that the stone rows were in effect a Bronze Age lunar observatory, tracking lunar movements over a cycle of 18.6 years. However, more than twenty similar stone rows are now known in Caithness and Sutherland and none of the others has been linked with astronomical observations.

In Britain stone rows of this kind are unknown outside Caithness and Sutherland, but similar rows of much taller stones are found in Brittany.

See also

Celtic calendar

References

Megalithic monuments in Scotland
Archaeological sites in Caithness
Bronze Age sites in Scotland
Scheduled monuments in Scotland